Banswada is a Town and Revenue division in Kamareddy district of the Indian state of Telangana.

Geography 
It has an average elevation of 371 meters (1220 feet).

Politics 
Earlier, Banswada was a major Grama Panchayat with 20 election wards. Then, after 11 January 2018, Banswada was upgraded to municipality grade 3 .MCB (Purapalaka Sangam Banswada). It was also the filming location for the film Fidaa.
In July 2019 Banswada municipality is divided in to 19 election wards, Banswada municipality electors are above 20000, total municipality population above 34000.

Transport 
Banswada is situated on Hyderabad-Medak-Bodhan- Bhainsa National Highway No. 765D. The nearest railway stations are at Nizamabad, Bodhan and Kamareddy. The Telangana State Road Transport Corporation operates bus services from Banswada to many cities and towns. Banswada (BSWD) has a TSRTC depot, which opened on 6 March 1993. Many buses from Banswada to Warangal (via Nizamabad), Adilabad, Bidar, Aurad, Hanegaon, Malegaon-Chandegaon, Hyderabad, JBS, Pitlam-JBS, Bichkunda-JBS, Bodhan-Hyderabad, Nizamabad-Hyderabad, Kamareddy-JBS, Medak-Hyderabad, Medak-Jbs, Deglore, Udgir, Kangti, Zehirabad, Sangareddy, Patancher, and Degulwadi.

Assembly constituency 

Banswada is an assembly constituency in Telangana. Pocharam Srinivas Reddy from the Telangana Rashtra Samithi was elected in the 2018 Assembly Elections as a Member of the Legislative Assembly (MLA), earlier he resigned for the cause of Separate State of Telangana and joined the Telangana Rashtra Samithi party on 25 March 2011. The Election Commission has re-conducted bypoll elections. This time Pocharam Srinivas Reddy has won the elections from the Telangana Rashtra Samithi party with a huge majority of nearly 50,000 votes on 17 October 2011.

Health services 
There is one area hospital under Telangana Vaidya Vidhana Parishad in Kamareddy district.
 Anvita Hospital
 Babu Shinde Hospital
 Jivan Reddy Hospital
 Balaji Hospital
 Global dental Hospital
 Bindu shree Hospital
 Jagruti Hospital
 Manjeera Multi Speciality Hospital
 7 Hills Hospital

References 

Cities and towns in Kamareddy district